Jason Emanuel Gould (born December 29, 1966) is an American actor and singer.

Early life 
Gould was born on December 29, 1966, in New York City, the only child of singer and actress Barbra Streisand and actor Elliott Gould. His parents separated in 1969 and divorced July 9, 1971.

Career 
Gould appeared as Mike Cameron in the romantic comedy-drama film Say Anything... (1989) and the romantic drama film The Prince of Tides (1991) (which was directed by and starred his mother) but has seldom appeared in front of the camera since then.

In 1997, he made his West End theatre début in the drama play The Twilight of the Golds at the Arts Theatre in London; he played the part of David, a theatre-designer.

Gould wrote, produced, and directed the short comedy film Inside Out (1997), playing Aaron in the story of the child of two celebrities who is outed by the tabloids. His father Elliott Gould played his father in the short film, and his half-brother Sam Gould played his brother. The short was later combined with other features for the compilation film Boys Life 3 (2000).

More recently, Gould has focused on a singing career. He released an EP, Jason Gould (2012), and the single "Morning Prayer/Groove" (2013), though it is also on the EP. Gould performed with his mother during her 2012 North American tour and also during her 2013 European tour. He also sings in "How Deep is the Ocean" on her Partners album, published in 2014. In 2017, he released an album, Dangerous Man.

Personal life 
At the age of 21, Gould came out to his parents as gay. By 1991, he was outed by tabloids. In an interview with The Advocate published on August 17, 1999, Streisand said:

Filmography

Theatre work

Discography

Musical collaborations

References

External links 
 
 
 Jason Gould at Discogs

1966 births
Living people
20th-century American male actors
20th-century American writers
21st-century American male actors
21st-century American writers
Male actors from Los Angeles
Male actors from New York City
American male film actors
American male screenwriters
American male stage actors
American people of Austrian-Jewish descent
American people of Russian-Jewish descent
Barbra Streisand
Film directors from New York City
Film producers from California
American gay actors
American gay writers
Jewish American male actors
Jewish American writers
LGBT Jews
Writers from Los Angeles
Writers from New York City
LGBT people from New York (state)
Film directors from Los Angeles
Screenwriters from California
Screenwriters from New York (state)